Xrobb l-Għaġin Tower, originally known as Torre di Siuarep, is a ruined watchtower in Xrobb l-Għaġin, limits of Marsaxlokk, Malta. It was built in 1659 as the eighth of the De Redin towers. An entrenchment with two redans was built around it in 1761. The tower is now largely destroyed since it was built of globigerina limestone which is prone to erosion. The remains of the tower's scarped base, as well as the general outline of the entrenchment, can still be seen.

References

De Redin towers
Towers completed in 1659
Marsaxlokk
Ruins in Malta
Demolished buildings and structures in Malta
1659 establishments in Malta
18th Century military history of Malta